2-Amino-4-hydroxy-6-pyrophosphoryl-methylpteridine (7,8-Dihydropterin pyrophosphate, dihydropterin-CH2OH-diphosphate) is a pteridine; a precursor to dihydrofolic acid.

References

Pteridines